Margaret Rosamond Fawcett Norrie (16 October 1905 – 23 August 1983) was a Liberal party member of the Senate of Canada. She was born in Upper Sackville, New Brunswick, becoming a farmer and an assistant professor in biology.

Norrie was appointed to the Senate for the Colchester-Cumberland, Nova Scotia division on 27 April 1972 following nomination by Prime Minister Pierre Trudeau. She retired as a senator on 16 October 1980.

External links
 

1905 births
1983 deaths
Canadian academics
Canadian farmers
Canadian senators from Nova Scotia
Women members of the Senate of Canada
Liberal Party of Canada senators
People from Westmorland County, New Brunswick
20th-century Canadian women politicians